Sveta Ema is a settlement in the Municipality of Podčetrtek in eastern Slovenia. The area around Podčetrtek was traditionally part of the region of Styria. It is now included in the Savinja Statistical Region.

The settlement gets its name from the parish church, dedicated to Saint Hemma. It belongs to the Roman Catholic Diocese of Celje. It was built in 1717.

References

External links
Sveta Ema on Geopedia

Populated places in the Municipality of Podčetrtek